Giovanni Savarese (born July 14, 1971) is a Venezuelan  football manager and former player, who is the head coach for the Portland Timbers.

Club career

Professional Breakthrough
Savarese made his professional debut at 15, with Venezuelan club Deportivo Italia during the 1986–87 season. He remained with the club through the 1988–89 season, scoring six goals that year.

Move to the United States
In 1990, Savarese moved to the United States to play college soccer at Long Island University Brooklyn, while joining the storied amateur club Greek-American Atlas of the Cosmopolitan Soccer League during the long collegiate off-season. He became one of the top scorers in school history with LIU, scoring 50 goals for the Blackbirds in his career. After college, Savarese signed with the Long Island Rough Riders of the USISL along with future MLS stars Tony Meola and Chris Armas, winning the league championship in 1995, a season in which he was also named league MVP.

MetroStars
Drafted by the New York/New Jersey MetroStars in the 9th round of the MLS Inaugural Player Draft, Savarese scored the first goal in club history in its inaugural match against the LA Galaxy on 13 April 1996. Savarese proved a prolific scorer during the 1996 season, scoring the next seven goals for the MetroStars and cementing his place in the team sheet. Savarese spent three seasons with the MetroStars, setting the long-standing club record for career goals in league play at 41, as well as the club scoring record across all competitions at 44. His record for league goals was broken in 2009 by Juan Pablo Angel. Savarese became a fan favorite, despite coming off the bench for long stretches of time. He was traded to the New England Revolution before the 1999 season and scored 10 goals for the Revs that year.

Additional Clubs
Departing MLS to sign for Serie A club Perugia in early 2000, Savarese spent his first stint in Europe loaned to Serie C club Viterbese for half a season, without being recalled to the Italian top division. He returned to MLS later in 2000 as a mid-season signing for the San Jose Earthquakes, but failed to score in four appearances that year. His luck improved after returning to Europe with Welsh club Swansea City in the English Second Division, tallying 14 goals across all competitions.

Savarese briefly transferred to Millwall before returning to his native Venezuela and signing for his boyhood club Deportivo Italia, then renamed Deportivo Italchacao.

After becoming an assistant coach at St. John's University, Savarese trialed with the MetroStars in 2003, but could not earn a place on the team. Following a sojourn back to Italy with Sassari Torres, he ended his playing career back in New York with the Rough Riders, then part of the USL Second Division.

Managerial career

MetroStars/Red Bulls
Savarese re-joined the MetroStars organization in 2005 as head of the club's successful youth development program, maintaining his role with through the Red Bull ownership transition before a philosophical conflict with the new management heralded his firing in March 2007.

New York Cosmos
In August 2010, Savarese joined the New York Cosmos as Cosmos Academy director, with a focus on developing youth talent in New York in preparation for the club's return to professional competition.

The Cosmos announced the promotion of Savarese to head coach on 19 November 2012. He quickly signed Long Island native Carlos Mendes as the modern club's first player in preparation for the team's debut in the NASL's 2013 Fall season. On 3 August 2013, the Cosmos defeated the Fort Lauderdale Strikers 2–1 in the team's first professional match. During the 2013 season, Savarese led the Cosmos to an undefeated record at home (W-D-L: 5–2–0) and winners of the 2013 NASL Fall Season title with an overall record of 31 points from 14 games (W-D-L: 9–4–1). The Cosmos would cap the season with an appearance in the 2013 championship match, where they defeated the Atlanta Silverbacks 1–0.

In 2014, Savarese managed the Cosmos to second place in the Spring season, finishing behind Minnesota by just 1 point. The Cosmos also took part in the U.S. Open Cup with Savarese leading the team to a convincing 3–0 fourth-round win over the New York Red Bulls in New York City's first-ever professional soccer derby on 14 June. The Cosmos would fall to eventual runners-up, the Philadelphia Union on 24 June in a 2–1 overtime defeat at PPL Park. After the end of the 2014 season, Savarese was offered the chance to interview for the vacant Houston Dynamo head coaching position.  He declined, preferring to stay with the Cosmos.

In 2015, Savarese led the Cosmos to an undefeated Spring, earning the title for the first half of the season. The team also defeated New York City FC in the US Open Cup in the first meeting between the two clubs. The Cosmos defeated the Ottawa Fury 3–2 in the 2015 NASL Championship Final to win their second league title since returning to professional competition.

The Cosmos were runners-up in the 2016 Spring season, but rallied to claim the Fall title by ten points, and with it the combined season table.  Savarese's club defeated Indy Eleven on penalty kicks in the 2016 NASL Championship Final, despite scheduling conflicts which forced the club to host the match at Belson Stadium in front of just 2,150 fans. Following the 2016 season, Savarese emerged as a finalist for the head coaching job with MLS expansion club Minnesota United FC. Talks with the new franchise fell apart when the Cosmos insisted on a transfer fee for releasing Savarese from the remainder of his contract, and the position went to Adrian Heath instead.

After the 2016 season ended, the Cosmos nearly folded, terminating all player contracts. Savarese took it upon himself to leverage his network of contacts to find new teams for his former players.  When the Cosmos were sold to a new investor, ensuring their survival, Savarese turned to re-signing many of the players who had been let go.

Following the tumultuous off-season, the 2017 season proved the roughest yet for Savarese and the Cosmos as they struggled through the regular season and lost in the opening round of the U.S. Open Cup to NPSL club Reading United AC. Despite draws in 9 of 16 Fall season matches, the Cosmos qualified for the playoff and upset the top-seeded Miami FC away on penalty kicks. The Cosmos season ended in a 2–0 loss to San Francisco Deltas in the playoff final.

On December 13, 2017, the Cosmos announced that Savarese would leave the club "to pursue other coaching opportunities".

Portland Timbers
On December 18, 2017, Savarese was announced as the head coach of the Portland Timbers, the third head coach in their MLS history.

International career
Savarese earned 30 caps for Venezuela, scoring 10 goals – including 3 in World Cup qualifiers. His most notable goal was against Argentina in 1996.

Broadcasting
Giovanni Savarese worked as a soccer analyst for ESPN International and ESPN Deportes.

Managerial statistics

Honors

Player
MLS All-Star: 1996
U.S. Soccer Hall of Fame: 2007

Head coach
New York Cosmos
NASL Championships (3): 2013, 2015, 2016
Runner-Up (1): 2017
NASL Regular Season Titles (3): 2013 Fall, 2015 Spring, 2016 Fall

Portland Timbers
MLS is Back Tournament: 2020

References

External links 
 
 New York Cosmos profile

1970 births
Living people
A.C. Perugia Calcio players
U.S. Viterbese 1908 players
Association football forwards
Caracas FC players
Deportivo Italia players
Deportivo Táchira F.C. players
Expatriate footballers in England
Expatriate footballers in Italy
Expatriate footballers in Wales
Expatriate soccer players in the United States
Greek American AA players
LIU Sharks men's soccer players
Long Island Rough Riders players
Major League Soccer All-Stars
Major League Soccer players
Millwall F.C. players
New England Revolution players
New York Red Bulls players
North American Soccer League coaches
Portland Timbers (MLS) coaches
San Jose Earthquakes players
Footballers from Caracas
Swansea City A.F.C. players
USISL players
Venezuela international footballers
Venezuelan expatriate footballers
Venezuelan expatriate sportspeople in England
Venezuelan expatriate sportspeople in Italy
Venezuelan expatriate sportspeople in Wales
Venezuelan expatriate sportspeople in the United States
Venezuelan footballers
Venezuelan people of Italian descent
S.E.F. Torres 1903 players
Venezuelan football managers